Contemporary Lynx Magazine is an international art magazine founded in 2013. It focuses on the art industry and visual culture of Poland through essays, interviews and specially commissioned artworks. It appears twice a year in both print and digital versions. It collaborates with the Polish e-commerce platform Allegro on the Allegro Prize, an international competition for emerging visual artists.

References

External links 

2013 establishments in the United Kingdom
Magazines established in 2013
Biannual magazines published in the United Kingdom
Independent magazines
Cultural magazines published in the United Kingdom